Auction Co. is an online auction company based in South Korea. It was acquired by eBay on January 8, 2001.

2008 Security Breach 
In April 2008, the company revealed that their customers' real name, username, resident registration number, address, phone number, email address, bank account number, and purchase and refund log were breached in February. Originally, the victims were thought to be 11 million users, but later it was found that all members of Auction, 18 million 630 thousand people's private informations were breached. Users filed a lawsuit against the company, but Court denied the responsibility of the company.

References

EBay
Shinsegae Group
Online auction websites of South Korea
Internet properties established in 1998
South Korean companies established in 1998
2001 mergers and acquisitions